Ján Zolna (born 27 May 1978) is a Slovak football player who played for Wakefield F.C.

References

1978 births
Living people
Slovak footballers
Slovak expatriate footballers
FC Metalurh Zaporizhzhia players
FC Vaslui players
FC Volyn Lutsk players
Ukrainian Premier League players
Expatriate footballers in Ukraine
Expatriate footballers in Romania
Expatriate footballers in England
Wakefield F.C. players
Association football goalkeepers